"Call Me What You Like" is a song by Keane, released as their first single in early 2000.
Limited to 500 copies, the now rare record was mixed and released by Zoomorphic, the band's own label set up to promote their music when a record deal was not forthcoming. It was subsequently sold at pub venues during early Keane gigs.

The title track and B-side "Closer Now" are two of the few songs credited to lead singer Tom Chaplin that have appeared on official releases. A re-recording of the single was included as a B-side on their follow-up 2001 single, "Wolf at the Door", and all three tracks appear on the 2009 Deluxe Edition release of the band's debut album, Hopes and Fears.

Track listing

CD single
"Call Me What You Like"
"Rubbernecking"
"Closer Now"

"Rubbernecking", remixed in 2001 by Tim Rice-Oxley and Tom Walker from the Universal Constructors, is an electronic piece little related to Keane's usual repertoire, featuring deep bass and heavy synthesizers.
On the other hand, "Closer Now" expresses a lighter atmosphere. Annie Lennox recorded a cover version of the song in 2009 for her album The Annie Lennox Collection. Lennox retitled the song "Pattern of My Life", which refers to a lyric in the song.
At least one demo version also exists on the web, featuring a deeper rhythm and slightly different vocals, with the same lyrics.

Technical information on songs

Notes

External links
Official site
Keane.fr – Information about record in French

2000 songs
2000 debut singles
Keane (band) songs
Songs written by Tim Rice-Oxley
Songs written by Tom Chaplin
Songs written by Richard Hughes (musician)
Songs written by Dominic Scott